Stereoskopia (minor planet designation: 566 Stereoskopia) is a large, outer main-belt asteroid orbiting the Sun. It was discovered on 28 May 1905 from Heidelberg by German astronomer Paul Götz. The discovery was made from photographic plates with the use of a stereo-comparator that had been provided by Carl Pulfrich, a German physicist at the Carl Zeiss Company. The asteroid name is a reference to this device.

This object is a member of the  Cybele group located beyond the core of the main belt. The orbital plane is inclined at an angle of 4.9° to the plane of the ecliptic. It spans a girth of approximately 167 km and is classified as a carbonaceous C-type asteroid.

See also
 Minor planet groups

References

External links
 
 

Cybele asteroids
Stereoskopia
Stereoskopia
C-type asteroids (Tholen)
19050528